"Sax" is the debut single by English singer, rapper and songwriter Fleur East, from her debut album Love, Sax and Flashbacks (2015). It was released as the lead single from the album on 6 November 2015 by Syco Records.

The song was a commercial success, peaking at number 3 in the UK. In September 2016, "Sax" was certified platinum by the BPI.

Background
After being announced as the runner-up of 11th series of The X Factor, East signed a recording contract with Syco Music in January 2015. She began working on her debut studio album after the X Factor tour was over, splitting her time between London and Los Angeles to record it. During recording, she was inspired by "Uptown Funk" by Mark Ronson featuring Bruno Mars, and described the songs on the album as "very uptempo and very energetic with lots of attitude. [The album has] got loads of influences from the old school. Lots of funk, hip-hop, soul; loads of different sounds fused together. Everything about that song - the uptempo vibe, the high energy, the brass, the old school funk sound - was just right up my street. I've definitely taken a few influences from that."

In July 2015, Syco's head Simon Cowell told The Sun: "I've heard it and it's world class. She has discovered who she wanted to be. Sometimes you just spot someone who's not obvious and Fleur's a good example of that". "Sax" was originally slated for release on 23 October 2015, then on 30 October, before being finally released on 6 November 2015 to coincide with her performance of the song on X Factor.

Critical reception
Digital Spy's writer Lewis Corner noted that the song was clearly inspired by "Uptown Funk", but its "brassed-up chorus, sassy lyrics and funky hook means it stands tall as a potential smash hit in its own right".

Music video
The official music video for "Sax" was released on 26 November 2015. It was directed by Colin Tilley, being the most colourful music video directed by him. It shows East smiling and walking in a five-colour square tunnel, and later shows her with some dancers in a colourful changing background. On 15 June 2016, another music video, titled "Sax in the City", was released for the song. It features East in different parts of New York City.

Live performances
"Sax" was first performed by East on Oxford Street Christmas lights switch-on event on 1 November 2015. She also performed it on the 12th series of The X Factor on 8 November. She performed the track on Alan Carr: Chatty Man on 20 November 2015, and also performed on The One Show on 27 November 2015, East returned to the final of the 12th series of The X Factor where she performed with girlband Little Mix, along with their song "Black Magic". On 25 December, East performed "Sax" on the Christmas special of Top of the Pops.

For her US debut, East performed "Sax" on the season finale of Dancing with the Stars on 25 May 2016. The following day, she performed the single on The Late Late Show with James Corden. On 2 June 2016, she made her debut on The Today Show where she was interviewed by Tamron Hall and Al Roker and performed the single.

Usage in media

"Sax" was used in Asda's 2015 Christmas television advert. It was also featured in a TMI television advert in late December 2015.

In Australia, it was used by Network Ten in promos promoting their 2016 programming lineup, particularly I'm a Celebrity...Get Me Out of Here!.

In the US, it was used by ABC in promos promoting the Mike Epps-starring Uncle Buck that premiered on 14 June 2016.

In Mexico, it was used in an advertisement for the insurance company GNP Seguros in 2018.

The track is in the subscription-based Just Dance Unlimited, as an exclusive for Just Dance 2018.

In 2018 the track was used in the movies Nobody’s Fool and Johnny English Strikes Again.

Track listing
Digital download
"Sax" – 3:56

Digital download – The Selection EP
"Sax" (Dance Rehearsal) [Video] – 3:56
"Sax" (Wideboys Remix) – 4:02
"Sax" (LuvBug Remix) – 3:36
"Sax" (Steve Smart Remix) – 3:34
"Sax" (Interview) – 3:57

Other version
"Sax" (Wideboys Club Mix) – 6:05

Charts and certifications

Weekly charts

Year-end charts

Certifications

References

2015 songs
2015 singles
Songs written by Kamille (musician)
Songs written by Henrik Barman Michelsen
Songs written by James Abrahart
Syco Music singles
Songs written by Edvard Forre Erfjord